Iphigenia is a genus of bivalves belonging to the family Donacidae.

The species of this genus are found in Africa and America.

Species:

Iphigenia altior 
Iphigenia brasiliensis 
Iphigenia centralis 
Iphigenia curta 
Iphigenia delessertii 
Iphigenia laevigata 
Iphigenia messageri 
Iphigenia psammobialis

References

Donacidae
Bivalve genera